Kkusum is an Indian television series produced by Ekta Kapoor's Balaji Telefilms which aired on Sony Entertainment Television from 14 May 2001 to 30 November 2005. and directed by Jasbir Bhati. The show follows the journey of a young, hardworking and middle class girl, Kkusum and later, after a 20 year leap on her daughter Kkumud.

The show starred Nausheen Ali Sardar in the titular role, and after a generation leap, it was played by Manasi Joshi Roy and Shilpa Saklani. Actor Anuj Saxena starred opposite her. The roles of Kkumud and Kali were essayed by Aashka Goradia and Rucha Gujarathi.

Plot 

This show is about a middle class girl, Kkusum Deshmukh (Nausheen Ali Sardar), everyone in her family is dependent on her. She becomes engaged to Prakash Chitre (Prakash Ramchandani), but Prakash leaves her because she isn't willing to leave her family with their responsibilities. Kkusum's parents are shattered. Then comes Nitin Kapoor (Nitin Trivedi), who asks Kkusum's hand in marriage for his son, Abhay Kapoor (Anuj Saxena) . Kkusum is shocked. But she meets him and puts forth a condition that she'll take her family's responsibilities after their marriage also. Abhay agrees with her. Kkusum is impressed with Abhay's progressive nature. They start meeting each other regularly and Kkusum gradually starts falling for Abhay. He always gifts her something. They happily marry each other.On their wedding night, he shows his weird sparks. He just tells her that he really likes her and pretends to go to sleep. She is confused. Weird incidents happen with the chandelier, snake, fire, etc. and Kkusum does not understand anything. Abhay also is having commitments with other girls. He is a playboy.

Kkusum finds out Abhay's truth but he always lies and saves himself. Kkusum also finds out that Abhay only married her because she is akhandsaubhagyavati (her husband will not die). Kkusum still stays because of her parents' respect. Abhay's friend Aryaman Oberoi (Aashish Kaul) befriends with Kkusum. Then later on, a girl named Esha Chopra (Shweta Kawatra) comes along. Esha and Kkusum also become very good friends. But Esha starts liking Abhay, Abhay is also attracted to her, they get together, and have an extra-marital affair, Kkusum consummates her marriage when Abhay comes home intoxicated.Kkusum becomes pregnant but Abhay says that the child is of Aryaman. Kkusum slaps Esha and leaves the house when she finds out about Abhay and Esha. She is  alone during her pregnancy stages. But Kkusum comes to the Kapoor Industries because her "in-laws" call her. Kkusum doesn't talk to Abhay. But due to some incidents, they become friends. Esha leaves because she thinks that Abhay is neglecting her and even Abhay realizes that he likes Kkusum so he proposes her again. Kkusum and Abhay patch up with each other. But Kkusum finds out that now Abhay cannot be a dad because of an accident that's why he called her back, because she's pregnant. Esha also comes back and befriends with Kkusum again. But Kkusum miscarries and holds Abhay responsible for the same. She again decides to leave the house but her mother-in-law, Sarla Nitin Kapoor (Rupa Divetia) insists her to stay in so Kkusum doesn't leave the house. Abhay is hurt by what Kkusum said so she apologizes to him. They are happy but then on Abhay's birthday she goes to pick him up from a farmhouse where she hears Abhay saying that he still has to act in front of Kkusum that he loves her. Kkusum's phone rings and Abhay and Esha are scared that someone heard them. Then they see Kkusum over there. Kkusum goes away from there to the Kapoor house. She goes there and waits for Abhay when he comes she slaps him twice and leaves saying that she'll never come back but her mother-in-law stops her. She tells Abhay to get out. Abhay leaves the house for sometime.

Meanwhile, there is a marriage proposal that comes to Tanya Kapoor (Ekta Sharma) who is Abhay's cousin sister. (They all love Kkusum and hate Abhay) Kkusum is supposed to do the set up of the pre-marriage  but the groom Siddharth Kanwar (Sandeep Rajora) falls for Kkusum instead of Tanya. Kkusum marries him despite not wanting to because of some unwanted reasons. Siddharth's paternal aunts, Pamela (Bhumika Seth), Natasha "Tashu" (Narayani Shastri), maternal aunt, Raima (Amita Chandekar), adoptive mother Reema (Prabha Sinha) and biological mother Devanshi (Krutika Desai Khan / Unknown) are evil so they try to break them up but they fail because Siddharth loves Kkusum. Kkusum also starts to love Siddharth. Tashu announces that she will marry none other than Abhay. Tashu and Abhay marry. Later, It is revealed that Abhay married Tashu so that he could get closer to Kkusum (because Tashu is Sid's paternal aunt). Tashu is also interested in Abhay's wealth only . Now, Abhay wants to cause problems with Sid—Kkusum but fails. Sid's mother takes all of Sid's property so that they're beggars. Sid and Kkusum leave for chawl. Kkusum exposes Tashu and Abhay divorces her. She is kicked out of both her families. Later on, Abhay has brain tumor, and he changes for the good forever, and again due to a series of events, Kkusum and Abhay become friends. Sid starts to suspect them and questions her about her character. Kkusum is deeply hurt because of Sid. They get divorced. Sid goes back to his mom. But he finds out that Kkusum wasn't lying about the brain tumor case so he calls her while driving. He crashes into a car and dies. Kkusum is shattered.

A while later, everyone figures out that Abhay has brain tumor and then Sarla comes to Kkusum for her son's life. Sarla wants Kkusum to marry Abhay. After a lot of dragging, they marry and go to the states. Abhay is treated there and now he is completely cured of cancer. With the help of medical sciences, he can now become a father as well. One day, They meet Esha. They live with her. Abhay starts to fall for Kkusum (for real this time) and Esha also starts liking Kkusum. But Kkusum can't forget Siddharth. They go back, Esha comes back after sometime, Kkusum starts to fall for Abhay again, they both don't tell each other about their feelings, Esha comes to live in with them and she too falls for Abhay despite knowing that he is married. She tries to get close to Abhay but fails. Kkusum finally confesses to Abhay that she loves him and they consummate. Esha is shattered. Then everyone finds out that Abhay accidentally killed Siddharth when he was having brain tumor attack while driving. For a while, Kkusum is mad at Abhay but later realises that it wasn't Abhay's fault at all. Kkusum still forgives him. Then Kkusum and Abhay find out about Esha so they kick her out. Kkusum becomes pregnant but miscarries again, Esha tells the doctors to declare Kkusum barren, everyone wants an heir that Kkusum cannot give, so Kkusum gets a surrogate mother Mahi (Poonam Narula), she also falls for Abhay. She creates such situations that Kkusum suspects Mahi and Abhay so she leaves without interrogating. But on the train she finds out that she is pregnant, she goes to tell Abhay but mistakenly assumes that Mahi and Abhay are sharing a bed. She leaves for Ludhiana. But her train crashes and she is presumed dead. Mahi gives birth to her daughter with Abhay, Kali (via surrogacy) and Kkusum gives birth to a slightly younger girl, Kkumud.

Twenty years later
Kkusum (Nausheen Ali Sardar) lives in Ludhiana with Kkumud (Aashka Goradia), Sumitra (Savita Prabhune) and her family-like neighbour Madhuri ( Alpana Buch) and her daughter Simran (Jennifer Winget). Kkumud secures a scholarship to study in a famous University of Mumbai. Kkusum doesn't allow her to go to Mumbai but later agrees with her as she doesn't want to take any chance with Kkumud's career. Kkumud always has hated her father. She comes to Mumbai along with her friend Simran for the scholarship. Kali (Rucha Gujarathi) is grown up to be a spoilt brat due Mahi's evil teachings. She will go to any limit to fulfill her obsession. She also studies in the same university where Kkumud has taken admission. Kali tries to rag Kkumud and Simran but is then left shameful by them. She wreaks havoc in Kkumud's life. She leaks exam papers, keeps drugs in Kkumud's bag and accuses her for all these crimes. But Kkumud manages to prove herself innocent. So, Kali joins hands with her boyfriend Nakul (Karanvir Bohra). They accuse Kkumud of molesting him. In the courthouse, Kkusum (who is now replaced by Manasi Joshi Roy) and Abay meet each other as Nakul is the younger son of Abhay's best friend Aryaman. Still, they don't reunite as Mahi creates even more misunderstandings between them. Nakul is proven to be lying, so Abhay breaks the engagement, Kali is forced to get engaged to Garv (Chetan Hansraj), Esha's Godson, who loves Kali, but she still loves Nakul. Kali still secretly meets Nakul. Soon, Garv finds out that Kali doesn't love him so he breaks the engagement. But soon Kali finds that Nakul is just after her wealth and she finds out that she genuinely loves Garv and not Nakul. Abhay finds out that Kkumud is his daughter, Kali feels insecure. Kkumud likes Kshitij (Amit Sareen) who is Nakul's elder brother. Esha plans to avenge Kkusum. She drugs Kkumud and Kshitij and they consummate. Kkumud becomes pregnant with his baby, but Kshitij finds out that he has cancer, so he pretends to hate Kkumud. Kkumud's friend Garv (who is also Kshitij's friend) tells her to forget Kshitij. She does so and marries Garv to get away from the society and also because he offered her to help. On Garv's and Kkumud's wedding day Kshitij finds out that he doesn't have cancer and that it was the conspiracy of his grandmother and Nakul.

He goes to prove it to Kkumud but is then proven guilty by Garv's evil bua (Sumukhi Pendse). Though being married, Kkumud and Garv still stay as best friends rather than being a husband-wife couple.They keep distance from each other. Kali tries to create misunderstandings between them and succeeds, Kali lies to Garv saying that she's pregnant with his child, Garv marries her to take on the responsibility of his child. This comes in front of everyone. Kkumud starts hating Garv to the core. They separate. But after a lot of trials by Kali to get closer to him, Garv finds out Kali's truth that she's not pregnant at all. They also divorce each other. Kkumud apologises to Garv but he decides to move on as they are just best friends. He knows that Kkumud's happiness is in Kshitij. So, He goes abroad. Meanwhile, Nakul and Kali also change into good forever. Nakul realises that he also genuinely loves Kali. He proposes her again but she refuses. She isn't able to forget Garv. So, Garv returns to India and helps Nakul win Kali's trust again. He succeeds in doing so, Kali and Nakul marry each other. Kali and Kkumud accept each other as sisters. Kkumud also decides to marry Kshitij, and she is happy with him, expecting her child. Everything is going well,  But then comes a storm in her life. Kshitij dies after falling from a cliff and Kkumud has a miscarriage with the news of Kshitij's death. She is shattered. Her life takes a huge turn as another man, Karan Oberoi (Nasirr Khan) enters her life. Mahi's misunderstandings are sorted. Kkusum (who is again replaced by Shilpa Saklani)and Abhay reconcile with each other. But sadly, Abhay also dies in an accident, which worsens the condition of Kkusum and the whole family. Meanwhile, Kkusum discovers that she has blood cancer and she, too is alive for some days only. Her only last wish is that she wants to see both of her daughters happy. Kali is happy in marital life but Kkumud is deeply hurt and unhappy by the demise of her two closely related family members. Kkusum asks Kkumud to marry Karan. She refuses because she thinks that it will hurt Kshitij's soul. She says that she can spend the rest of her life with his memories. But due to Kkusum's strong insist, Kkumud agrees with her. She marries Karan .Initially, they aren't able to cope up with each other but gradually fall in love. Kkumud is pregnant again. After seeing both of her daughters happy, Kkusum dies and gets reunited with her love, Abhay.

Time lapses by 5 years. Kkumud is shown happily living with her family and her daughter with Karan, also named as Kkusum. In the end, she puts a garland around the pictures of her parents and her first love, Kshitij. She says that her mother is dead only for the world. But she believes that Kkusum is still around her.

It all began with the tale of a simple girl, Kkusum. Many obstacles came along her path but she never lost her hope. She inculcated her same idealistic values in her daughter, Kkumud. Kkumud also faced a lot of tribulations in her life, from being an unmarried pregnant woman to losing her first love, Kshitij. But with time, she learnt how to deal with situations like Kkusum. Everything in her life sorted when she found her second love, Karan.

Kkusum and Abhay, being each other's soulmate died one after another, only at the gap of a few days . This brings the storyline to a full circle from the start to the end . Kkumud names her daughter with Karan, as KKusum. This starts the story of another "Kkusum”: Ek Aam ladki Ki Kahani.

Cast 
 Nausheen Ali Sardar / Manasi Joshi Roy as Kusum Deshmukh / Kusum Abhay Kapoor / Kusum Siddharth Kanwar (2001–2004) / (2004–2005) (Dead)
 Shilpa Saklani as 
 Kusum  Deshmukh / Kusum Abhay Kapoor  (after plastic surgery) (2005) (Dead)
 Swati Abhinav Gautam (2005) (Dead)
 Anuj Saxena / Rohit Roy / Anuj Saxena as Abhay Kapoor (2001–2002) / (2002–2003) / (2003–2005) (Dead)
 Sandeep Rajora as Siddharth Kanwar (2002–2003) (Dead) – Raman and Devanshi's son; Reema's step–son; Aastha, Muskaan and Simran's elder step–brother; Manik, Bobby and Trishul's elder paternal cousin; Kusum's second husband
 Aashka Goradia as Kumud Kapoor / Kumud Garv Sachdev / Kumud Kshitij Oberoi / Kumud Karan Oberoi (2003–2005)
 Poonam Narula as Mahi Abhay Kapoor (2003–2005)
 Nasir Khan as Karan Oberoi (2005)
 Chetan Hansraj as Advocate Garv Sachdev (2003–2005)
 Amit Sarin as Kshitij Oberoi (2003–2005) (Dead)
 Akashdeep Saigal as Trishul Kapoor (2005)
 Karanvir Bohra as Nakul Oberoi (2003–2005)
 Narayani Shastri as Natasha Kanwar / Natasha Abhay Kapoor (2002–2003; 2005) – Raman and Pamela's younger sister; Siddharth, Aastha, Muskaan and Simran's paternal aunt; Manik and Bobby's maternal aunt; Rajeev's ex–wife; Vikram's ex–wife; Abhay's ex–wife; Trishul's mother
 Mouli Ganguly as Vidhi Chopra / Vidhi Trishul Kapoor (2005)
 Aashish Kaul as Aryaman Oberoi (2001–2005) – Neelam's son; Sakshi's husband; Kshitij and Nakul's father; Abhay's best friend; Kusum's sworn brother
 Karishma Randhawa / Mayuri Kango / Shalini Kapoor / Mandeep Bhandar as Sakshi Aryaman Oberoi (2003) / (2003–2004) / (2005) / (2005)
 Rucha Gujarathi as Kali Kapoor / Kali Garv Sachdev / Kali Nakul Oberoi (2003–2005)
 Eijaz Khan as Advocate Sohan Kapoor (2004–2005) (Dead)
 Shweta Kawatra as Esha Chopra (2001–2002; 2003–2004)
 Manav Gohil / Hiten Tejwani as Vishal Mehra (2001–2002) / (2003)
 Tasneem Sheikh as Jyoti Deshmukh / Jyoti Vishal Mehra (2001–2003)
 Smita Singh / Smriti Shetty as Sonali Deshmukh (2001–2002) / (2002–2003)
 Savita Prabhune as Sumitra Vishwanath Deshmukh (2001–2005)
 S.K. Batra / Saurabh Dubey as Vishwanath Deshmukh (2001–2002) / (2002–2003)
 Nitin Trivedi as Nitin Kapoor (2001–2005)
 Rupa Divetia as Sarala Nitin Kapoor (2001–2005)
 Pratim Parekh as Kapil Kapoor (2001–2005)
 Manisha Kanojia / Usha Bachani as Arundhati Kapil Kapoor (2001–2004) / (2004–2005)
 Moonmoon Banerjee / Unknown / Kanika Kohli as Ruhi Kapoor (2001–2002) / (2003) / (2003)
 Bakul Thakkar as Lalit Kapoor (2001–2005)
 Raymon Singh / Natasha Rana as Nikita Malhotra / Nikita Lalit Kapoor (2001–2005) / (2005)
 Jennifer Winget as Simran (2003–2004)
 Harmeet Gulzar / Vishal Watwani as Yash Deshmukh (2001–2002) / (2002–2003)
 Simple Kaul as Aastha Kanwar / Aastha Yash Deshmukh (2002–2003)
 Rajesh Kumar / Amit Behl as Shashank Deshmukh (2001–2003) / (2005)
 Chandni Toor / Monalika Bhonsle as Priyanka Shashank Deshmukh (2001–2002) / (2003)
 Vishal Puri as Jimmy Tolani (2002–2003)
 Puneet Vashisht as Anil Nagpal (2001–2002)
 Amar Upadhyay as Dr. Abhinav Gautam (2005)
 Abir Goswami as Sandeep (Sangu) Gujral (2001–2002)
 Vikas Bhalla as Mohnish Manchandani (2002–2003)
 Sonia Sahni as Mrs. Talwar (Siddharth's Nanimaa) (2002–2003)        
 Amita Chandekar as Raima Talwar (2002–2003)
 Abhimanyu Singh as Ajay Maliya (2002; 2003)
 Ekta Sharma as Tanya Kapoor (2001–2004; 2005)
 Prabha Sinha as Reema Talwar / Reema Raman Kanwar (2002–2003)
 Kruttika Desai / Unknown as Devanshi Narang / Devanshi Raman Kanwar (2002–2003) / (2003)
 Anil Dhawan as Raman Kanwar (2003) (Dead)
 Karishma Tanna as Muskaan Kanwar (2002)
 Sonia Kapoor as Naina Bajaj (2002)
 Priya Sampat as Simran Kanwar (2002–2003)
 Shivani Manchanda as Meghna Yash Deshmukh (2001–2002)
 Pratibha Goregaonkar as Sujata, Meghna's mother (2001–2002)
 Pratap Sachdev as Mr. Shastri, Sujata's brother and Meghna's maternal uncle (2001–2002)
 Malavika Arora as Mrs. Shastri, Meghna's maternal grandmother; Sujata and Mr. Shastri's mother (2001–2002)
 Bhumika Seth as Pamela (Pammi) Kanwar (2002–2003)
 Akhil Ghai as Rajeev Rawal (2002; 2003)
 Anand Suryavanshi as Gautam Bajaj (2001)
 Sandeep Baswana as Kamal (2002)
 Chinky Jaiswal as Child Simi Gautam (2005)
 Vinay Jain as Devkant Sahay (2002)
 Apurva Gupta as Child Sohan Kapoor (2001–2002; 2003)
 Mitalee Jagtap Varadkar as Sharmila, Kusum's office colleague and friend (2001–2002)
 Kusumit Sana as Suzanne (2001–2002)
 Talat Rekhi as Yash Raichand (2005)
 Neelam Mehra as Mrs. Raichand (2005)
 Saurabh Arya as Harry (2003–2005)
 Deepak Dutta as Shabir (2004)
 Preeti Puri as Jenny Anthony (2005) (Dead)
 Aliraza Namdar as Jagmohan Agarwal (2002; 2003)
 Anju Mahendru as Neelam Oberoi 
 Sudha Shivpuri as Jimmy's grandmother (2002)
 Tarana Raja as Sonia Jhulka (2002)
 Shabnam Mishra as Mallika Bedi (2002)
 Kiran Dubey as Shivani Hinduja (2002)
 Kuljeet Randhawa as Shaila Khan (2002)
 Nilofer Khan as Geetika Mathur (2002)
 Shraddha Sharma as Preeti Mathur (2002)
 Kaushal Kapoor as Judge (2003)
 Sumukhi Pendse as Priya Sachdev, Garv and Garima's Paternal Aunt (2004)
 Rio Kapadia as Vikram Sachdev (2004)
 Reshma Modi as Meenakshi Vikram Sachdev (2004)
 Prakash Ramchandani as Prakash Chitre (2001; 2002)
 Anuj Gupta as Mack (2001–2002)
 Kunal Kumar as Cyrus (2001)
 Manmeet Gulzar as Radheshyam (Guddu) (2002)
 Rajesh Sabharwal as Rahul Kapoor (2001; 2002)
 Ritu Deepak as Poonam Rahul Kapoor (2001)
 Shamim Sheikh as Manohar Singh, Nikita's Tauji (2002)
 Afshan Khan as Monica (2001)
 Jayant Rawal as Ramakant (2001–2002)
 Faizan Kidwai as Manik (2002–2003)
 Bobby Bhonsle as Bobby (2002–2003)
 Sujata Sanghamitra as Vandana Vishal Mehra (2003)
 Madhur Arora as Agnivesh (2004–2005)
 Anand Abhyankar as Priyanka's father (2002)
 Utkarsha Naik as Uma (Priyanka's mother) (2002)
 Kishori Godbole as Kusum's Younger Sister (2001)
 Darshan Dave as Mohit Srivastav (2001)
 Rocky Verma as Kidnapper (2005)
 Rishina Kandhari as Sonia (2004)

Special Appearances 
 Eijaz Khan as Varun Raheja from Kahiin To Hoga (Episode 671) (2004)
 Poonam Joshi as Mehak Varun Raheja from Kahiin To Hoga (Episode 671) (2004)
 Shakti Anand as Party Host (Episode 821) (2005)
 Hiten Tejwani as Samay Punj from Kkoi Dil Mein Hai (Episode 821) (2005)
 Karishma Tanna as Kritika Samay Punj from Kkoi Dil Mein Hai (Episode 821) (2005)
 Apurva Agnihotri as Armaan Suri from Jassi Jaissi Koi Nahin (Episode 915) (2005)
 Rakhi Vijan as Anjali Suri from Jassi Jaissi Koi Nahin (Episode 915) (2005)
 Mahru Sheikh as Ila Purushottam Suri from Jassi Jaissi Koi Nahin (Episode 915) (2005)

Adaptations

References

External links

Balaji Telefilms television series
2001 Indian television series debuts
2005 Indian television series endings
Sony Entertainment Television original programming
Indian television soap operas